Thistle Brook is a short, minor river (brook) in Buckinghamshire, England that is a tributary to the River Thame.

Located entirely in the Aylesbury Vale district, the brook rises in a farm (historically Thistlebrook farm) in the civil parish of Mentmore, west of the village of Mentmore and south of Crafton, and flows south-west past Wingrave (located towards the north) and through a culvert under a road in the neighbourhood of Thistlebrook, before flowing into the River Thame.

References 

Rivers of Buckinghamshire